Tunica is a town in and the county seat of Tunica County, Mississippi, United States, near the Mississippi River. Until the early 1990s when casino gambling was introduced in the area, Tunica had been one of the most impoverished places in the United States.  Despite this economic improvement, Tunica's population continues to decline from its peak in 1970.

History
The community derives its name from the Tunica Indians which once were numerous in the area. Tunica is the fourth community to serve as county seat of Tunica County, succeeding earlier county seats at Commerce (1839–1842, 1842–1847), Peyton (1842, temporary) and Austin (1847–1888).

Tunica gained national attention for its deprived neighborhood known as "Sugar Ditch Alley", named for the open sewer located there. Its fortunes have improved since development of a gambling resort area nearby during the early 1990s. While population growth has taken place mostly outside Tunica, the major casinos employ numerous locals. They attract visitors from nearby Memphis, Tennessee, West Memphis, Arkansas and all over the Southeastern United States.

Geography

Demographics

2020 census

As of the 2020 United States Census, there were 1,026 people, 501 households, and 293 families residing in the town.

2000 census
As of the census of 2000, there were 1,132 people, 537 households, and 254 families residing in the town. The racial makeup of the town was 67.84% White, 29.42% African American, 0.27% Native American, 1.06% Asian, 0.88% from other races, and 0.53% from two or more races. Hispanic or Latino of any race were 2.30% of the population.

There were 537 households, of which 18.4% had children under the age of 18 living with them, 34.3% were married couples living together, 11.2% had a female householder with no husband present, and 52.7% were non-families. Of all households, 48.0% were made up of individuals, and 26.4% had someone living alone who was 65 years of age or older. The average household size was 2.01 and the average family size was 2.94.

In the town, the population was spread out, with 18.9% under the age of 18, 6.1% from 18 to 24, 23.4% from 25 to 44, 28.3% from 45 to 64, and 23.3% who were 65 years of age or older. The median age was 46 years. For every 100 females, there were 87.7 males. For every 100 females age 18 and over, there were 80.0 males.

The median income for a household in the town was $26,607, and the median income for a family was $54,583. Males had a median income of $30,208 versus $22,250 for females. The per capita income for the town was $20,114. About 17.1% of families and 25.5% of the population were below the poverty line, including 33.3% of those under age 18 and 21.3% of those age 65 or over.

Casino economy 
Casino gambling's effect on the local economy has spurred population growth in unincorporated parts of the county outside Tunica proper. Since 1990, the town's name has been popularly associated with several casinos located near the Mississippi River. However, the current group of casinos is located in the community of Tunica Resorts, 10 miles north of the town of Tunica, and extending to the DeSoto County line.

Tunica Resorts was originally named "Robinsonville", but the name was changed in 2005 to eliminate confusion over the location of the casinos, which have always used the name "Tunica" as an identifier. The success of these gaming houses in northern Tunica County came at the expense of the area's first group of casinos in the early 1990s, located just northwest of Tunica proper, in an area known as Mhoon Landing. This now comprises the current census-designated place of North Tunica. These casinos were closed or moved as larger resorts opened closer to Memphis to attract its larger residential base.

Unlike the area including casinos along Mississippi's Gulf Coast region, Tunica was not in the path of Hurricane Katrina. As a result, some of the regular Gulf Coast customer traffic from casinos drifted northward to Tunica County while repairs and reconstruction were underway in the Gulf Coast locations.

Though the casinos lie outside the town limits, the benefits of tax revenue generated have also aided the town. Major improvements to the public school system and downtown district are among the most visible aspects. Long-term effects include major highway improvements on U.S. Route 61 and a much-discussed potential expansion of Tunica Municipal Airport.

As of 2007, some Tunica Resorts residents are trying to incorporate their community as a separate town government, rather than operate under the jurisdiction of Tunica County or be annexed into the town of Tunica. If Tunica Resorts incorporates, the new town government would directly benefit from casino tax revenue, enabling construction of municipal government offices. Depending on population and revenue growth, fire and police stations, libraries and other public infrastructure could be other likely additions. Potential effects on the existing town of Tunica are unclear.

Education
The Town of Tunica is served by the Tunica County School District. Zoned schools include Tunica Elementary School, Tunica Middle School, and Rosa Fort High School.

Tunica Academy is located in an unincorporated area in Tunica County, near Tunica.

In popular culture 
Tunica is mentioned in Elmore Leonard's 2002 novel Tishomingo Blues.

Tunica is mentioned by Terry Benedict, a character played by Andy Garcia, in the 2007 film Ocean's Thirteen.

Notable people
 Brandon Bryant,  NFL Player
 Parker Hall, 1939 Most Valuable Player of the National Football League
 Charlaine Harris, New York Times bestselling author
 Benardrick McKinney, NFL linebacker
 James Cotton, blues harmonica player
 Donald Hawkins, NFL Player

Transportation 
Tunica Municipal Airport has had airline service intermittently with aircraft such as Boeing 727 jets of Pan Am Clipper Connection and Boeing 737 jets of Air Tran offering commercial services. The closest airport with continuous airline service is Memphis International Airport in Memphis, Tennessee, which is about 30 minutes away by car.

See also 

 Tunica Resorts, Mississippi

References

External links

 
 Mississippi Monte Carlo, an article from The Atlantic magazine on the impact of casino gambling in Tunica
 Visitor's Guide 
 The Tunica Times, the weekly newspaper serving Tunica and Tunica County

Towns in Tunica County, Mississippi
County seats in Mississippi
Cities in the Memphis metropolitan area
Gambling in Mississippi
Populated places established in 1888
1888 establishments in Mississippi
Towns in Mississippi
Mississippi placenames of Native American origin